Marcus Jared Turner (born January 13, 1966) is a former professional American football cornerback in the National Football League (NFL). He played seven seasons for the Phoenix Cardinals and the New York Jets. Turner attended Jordan High School, in Long Beach, CA.

1966 births
Living people
Players of American football from Los Angeles
American football cornerbacks
UCLA Bruins football players
Phoenix Cardinals players
New York Jets players
People from Harbor City, Los Angeles
Ed Block Courage Award recipients